The Caves of Aggtelek Karst and Slovak Karst is a UNESCO World Heritage site consisting of 712 caves spread out over a total area of  along the border of Hungary and Slovakia.

Background 

This UNESCO World Heritage site includes seven components. They are Aggtelek, Szendrő-Rudabánya Hill, and Esztramoill in Hungary, and Dobšiná Ice Cave, Koniar plateau, Plešivec plateau, and neighbourhood of Silica and Jasov in Slovakia.

Caves included are:

Baradla and Domica complex
Gombasek Cave
Silica Ice Cave
Dobšiná Ice Cave
Ochtinská Aragonite Cave
Jasovská Cave

The first written mention of Baradla cave dates back to 1549 and from 1920 it serves as a tourist attraction. Cave was inhabited as far as 5000 BC and is an important archeological site of Bükk Culture.

Gombasek Cave was discovered in 1951 with 530 out of its  opened to the public from 1955. Geomorphologically it is one of the youngest but nevertheless also one of the most impressive caves in Slovakia with extraordinary decoration that gave it the nickname "Fairy tale cave".

Dobšiná Ice Cave was added to the list of components of this World Heritage Site only in the year 2000. The cave was discovered in 1870 by Eugen Ruffinyi, though the entrance was known long before. Being open to the public just one year after its discovery, in 1887 it became the first electrically lit cave in Europe. Approximately one third of its  length is open from May to September. This cave is among the most beautiful and the most richly decorated ice caves in the world.

In the so-called Milky Way Hall, the main attraction of the cave, white branches and clusters of aragonite shine like stars in the Milky Way. The cave was discovered in 1954 and opened to the public in 1972.

'Jasovská Cave was partly opened to the public in 1846, making it the oldest publicly accessible cave in Slovakia. The lower parts of the cave were discovered from 1922 to 1924. More than one third of its  total length is open to the public. Paleolithic and Neolithic archeological artifacts were found in the cave together with those of Hallstatt Culture.

See also 

List of caves in Slovakia
Slovak Karst National Park
Aggtelek National Park
Slovak Karst

Gallery

References

Resources 

 
Caves of Hungary
Caves of Slovakia
Protected areas of the Western Carpathians
Geography of Borsod-Abaúj-Zemplén County
Geography of Košice Region
Aggtelek Karst and Slovak Karst
Show caves in Slovakia
World Heritage Sites in Hungary
World Heritage Sites in Slovakia
Ramsar sites in Hungary
Ramsar sites in Slovakia
Tourist attractions in Borsod-Abaúj-Zemplén County
Tourist attractions in Košice Region